SLAM family member 8 is a protein that in humans is encoded by the SLAMF8 gene.

Function 

This gene encodes a member of the CD2 family of cell surface proteins involved in lymphocyte activation. These proteins are characterized by Ig domains. This protein is expressed in lymphoid tissues, and studies of a similar protein in mouse suggest that it may function during B cell lineage commitment. The gene is found in a region of chromosome 1 containing many CD2 genes.

References

Further reading